Russian Bandy Supreme League is the second tier of Russian bandy, below Russian Bandy Super League. In the 2016–17 season, 23 teams competed in three groups. Stroitel and Zorky have been promoted to the Super League for the 2017-18 season, while no team has been relegated from the Super League.

Teams
Teams for the 2017–18 season.

Group 1
 Dynamo Krylatskoye
 Murman
 Rodina-2
 SShOR No. 1
 Start-2
 Vodnik-2
 Volga-2
 Zorky-2

Group 2
 Akzhayik
 Dynamo Kazan-2
 Lokomotiv
 Mayak
 Nikelshchik
 SKA-Sverdlovsk
 Znamya-Udmurtiya

Group 3
 Baykal-Energiya-2
 Kuzbass-2
 Sayany
 Sibselmash-2
 SKA-Neftyanik-2
 Vostok
 Yenisey-2

References

Supreme
National bandy leagues
Professional sports leagues in Russia